There are at least 69 named trails in Fremont County, Wyoming according to the U.S. Geological Survey, Board of Geographic Names.  A trail is defined as: "Route for passage from one point to another; does not include roads or highways (jeep trail, path, ski trail)."
 Absaroka Trail, el.  
 Bear Creek Trail, el.  
 Bears Ears Trail, el.  
 Blue Trail, el.  
 Boundary Trail, el.  
 Burroughs Creek Trail, el.  
 C M Trail, el.  
 Christina Lake Trail, el.  
 Christina Lake Trail, el.  
 Cold Spring Trail, el.  
 Cougar Pass Trail, el.  
 Devils Hole Trail, el.  
 Dinwoody Trail, el.  
 Dry Creek Trail, el.  
 Du Noir Trail, el.  
 DuNoir Trail, el.  
 East Du Noir Trail, el.  
 East Fork Trail, el.  
 Farlow Trail, el.  
 Fish Lake Trail, el.  
 Frontier Creek Trail, el.  
 Gaylord Lake Trail, el.  
 Geyser Creek Trail, el.  
 Glacier Trail, el.  
 High Meadow Trail, el.  
 Ice Lakes Trail, el.  
 Indian Point Trail, el.  
 Indian Trail, el.  
 Ink Wells Trail, el.  
 Jakeys Fork Trail, el.  
 Johnson Trail, el.  
 Kisinger Lakes Trail, el.  
 Lake of the Woods Trail, el.  
 Leeds Creek Trail, el.  
 Little Sweetwater Trail, el.  
 Lizard Head Trail, el.  
 Louis Lake Trail, el.  
 Marston Pass Trail, el.  
 Middle Fork Trail, el.  
 Moon Lake Trail, el.  
 Moss Lake Trail, el.  
 Ninemile Trail, el.  
 Oregon Trail, el.  
 Parque Creek Trail, el.  
 Pelham Lake Trail, el.  
 Petes Lake Trail, el.  
 Pine Creek Trail, el.  
 Pinnacle Trail, el.  
 Pinto Park Trail, el.  
 Ramshorn Trail, el.  
 Ramshorn Trail, el.  
 Ross Lake Trail, el.  
 Sheridan Trail, el.  
 Shoshone Stock Driveway, el.  
 Sioux Pass Trail, el.  
 Smith Lake Trail, el.  
 South Fork Fish Creek Trail, el.  
 Squaw Creek Trail, el.  
 Stough Creek Basin Trail, el.  
 Sweetwater Trail, el.  
 Tepee Creek Trail, el.  
 Twilight Creek Trail, el.  
 Union Pass Trail, el.  
 Washakie Trail, el.  
 Whiskey Mountain Trail, el.  
 Wiggins Fork Trail, el.  
 Wolf Trail, el.  
 Yellow Trail, el.

See also
 List of trails in Wyoming

Notes

Geography of Fremont County, Wyoming
Historic trails and roads in Wyoming